Gautam Biswas (born 23 May 1956) is presently a professor of mechanical engineering at the Indian Institute of Technology (IIT) Kanpur. Earlier, he has been the director of Indian Institute of Technology Guwahati, and director of the CSIR - Central Mechanical Engineering Research Institute at Durgapur. As a faculty member of IIT Kanpur, he has served the Institute in various capacities including the Dean of Academic Affairs. Prof Gautam Biswas is a Fellow of the three science academies, such as, the Indian National Science Academy (INSA, New Delhi), the Indian Academy of Sciences (IAS, Bangalore) and the National Academy of Sciences India (NASI, Allahabad). He is a Fellow of the Indian National Academy of Engineering (INAE) and Institution of Engineers (IEI). He was the occupant of the position of GD and VM Mehta Endowed Chair Professor of Mechanical Engineering at the Indian Institute of Technology Kanpur. A Fellow of the American Society of Mechanical Engineers (ASME), Prof Biswas is the author of more than 150 scientific publications and guided 23 PhD theses. In the year 2011, he was awarded the esteemed J C Bose National Fellowship by the Science and Engineering Research Board (DST), Government of India. Biswas completed his B.E. from IIEST(Erstwhile B.E. College under Calcutta University) in 1979. He completed his PhD from the Indian Institute of Technology Kharagpur in 1985. He was an Alexander von Humboldt Fellow at the Ruhr University Bochum in Germany and JSPS Invitation Fellow at the Yokohama National University, Japan. He has been a guest professor at the Friedrich-Alexander-Universität Erlangen-Nürnberg, Germany. Prof. Biswas was awarded an honorary doctorate by the National Institute of Technology Agartala in 2017. He has been conferred honorary doctorate by the Aristotle University of Thessaloniki, Greece, in 2018. In recognition of his stellar contribution in the fields of Fluid Mechanics and Thermal Sciences, his contributions as an academic administrator and his dedicated service to the institute, IIT Kanpur bestowed upon Professor Gautam Biswas the award of Institute Fellow for the year 2020. In recognition of his outstanding contribution to teaching, IIT Kanpur conferred the Distinguished Teacher Award upon Professor Gautam Biswas in the year 2022.

Gautam Biswas has made original contributions of long-lasting value in the areas of heat transfer and fluid mechanics. His work on enhancement of heat transfer using delta-winglet type vortex generators is a major contribution which is included in the advanced international text books. The innovative concept has been used by the Industry for various HAVC systems. Furthermore, he has contributed significantly in understanding the bluff body flows. His work on large-eddy simulation of flow past bluff bodies and heat transfer in impinging jets have been deeply admired by the scientific community. Contributions of Prof. Biswas pertaining to handling free surface flows and some of his investigations related to prediction of bubble growth in film boiling are considered to be path-breaking. Prof. Biswas and co-researchers analyzed impact of falling drops on a liquid surface and made fundamental contributions to the body of knowledge related to partial coalescence and the transition between coalescence and splashing. Experimental evidence of large bubble entrapment occurring outside the traditional small region on the V-D map, made the boundary of large bubble entrapment a topic of greater importance. A seminal contribution of his group probes the zone of large bubble entrapment and underlying physics. He has made significant impact through his publications on formation of air bubbles from a submerged orifice. His group analyzed the impact of a train of high-speed microdrops on a deep liquid pool. The work explained mechanistic route leading to creation of a deep cavity inside the liquid pool. Prof. Biswas and the co-researchers contributed in understanding that the EMT cells are more drug resistant with a concomitant two-fold higher expression of the multi-drug resitance (MDR1) gene.

References

Indian Institute of Technology directors
Academic staff of the Indian Institute of Technology Guwahati
1956 births
Living people
West Bengal academics